Gagarin: First in Space a.k.a.. First man In Space is a 2013 Russian  docudrama biopic about the first man in space, Yuri Gagarin, and the 1961 mission of Vostok 1. It was released by Central Partnership theatrically in Russia on June 6, 2013, and in the United Kingdom on DVD on June 23, 2014 by Entertainment One.  The film's running time of 108 minutes approximates the time it took Gagarin to go around the Earth before returning. It stars Yaroslav Zhalnin as Soviet fighter pilot and cosmonaut Yuri Gagarin. The film received mixed reviews, with some critics praising the film's acting, direction and storytelling with others touching on the film's "cheap-looking" visual effects. The film received criticism for its state funding and ignoring the aftermath of the flight.

Plot
On April 12, 1961, Soviet cosmonaut Yuri Gagarin blasted off in a Vostok rocket, becoming the first human in space and orbiting Earth for 108 minutes. He was one of the first group of cosmonauts who were selected from over three thousand fighter pilots throughout the Soviet Union.

The legendary top twenty who were selected were the ace of aces and none of the pilots knew which amongst them would make history on the first crewed flight. Once chosen Gagarin is fast-tracked to train for the unknown and the trip of a lifetime.

Whilst strapped into his rocket, Gagarin reflects on his life, which is intercut with the determination of the Russian space team and their untiring efforts to send a man into space.

Cast

Release
The film was released on DVD and Digital Download on June 23, 2014 by Entertainment One.

Reception

The film ignored the rest of Gagarin's life, Daily Telegraph reviewer Martin Chilton said, and his death, for which there are many conspiracy theories. He noted other criticisms of the film as "sanitized", reporting that Gagarin's family supported the film, after having taken legal action against two previous depictions of Gagarin, in a musical and a fictional drama.

References

External links
 Gagarin. Pervyy v kosmose at the Internet Movie Database

2013 films
2013 biographical drama films
2010s historical films
2010s historical drama films
Drama films based on actual events
Films about astronauts
Films scored by George Kallis
Films set in 1961
Films set in Russia
Films set in the Soviet Union
Films shot in Russia
Russian historical adventure films
Russian historical drama films
Russian adventure drama films
2010s Russian-language films
Science docudramas
Space adventure films
Cultural depictions of Yuri Gagarin
Cultural depictions of Nikita Khrushchev
2013 drama films
Docudrama films